Aphyonus gelatinosus also known as the gelatinous blindfish is a species of blind cusk eel found in eastern Atlantic Ocean from Azores and Canary Islands; western Indian Ocean in Natal, South Africa and southwest Pacific Ocean known in Australia only from the type locality, off Cape York, Queensland. This species is the only known member of its genus.

References

Aphyonidae
Fish described in 1878
Taxa named by Albert Günther